Greatest Hits is Linda Ronstadt's first major compilation album, released at the end of 1976 for the holiday shopping season.  It includes material from both her Capitol Records and Asylum Records output, and goes back to 1967 for The Stone Poneys' hit "Different Drum."

It remains the biggest-selling album of Ronstadt's career, being certified seven times Platinum (over 7 million US copies shipped) by the Recording Industry Association of America in America alone, with 1.87 million units consumed after 1991 when SoundScan started tracking sales. It peaked at No. 6 on the main Billboard album chart and also reached No. 2 on Billboard'''s Top Country Albums chart, where it remained for over three years.

The album was criticized by the Rolling Stone Record Guide for being "premature," as Ronstadt continued to have record-breaking mainstream successes for many years following this release. By the time this collection came out, however, Ronstadt had already been recording hit records (as a solo artist and with the Stone Poneys) for a decade, and there were many examples of other artists releasing greatest hits albums much sooner, such as Elvis Presley.

In terms of being released while the performer was still in the midst of their career, this collection is unusual for a major artist in that it compiled works from two unrelated labels thanks to, as the sleeve states, a "special arrangement" between Asylum and Capitol; this overlap mirrors the situation in which Ronstadt briefly alternated releasing albums between Capitol and Asylum in 1973–74 in order to fulfil her contract with Capitol.

Track listing
Original release

CD reissue
The CD reissue of the album was compiled with Ronstadt's second greatest hits collection and released by Rhino records in 2007 as Greatest Hits, Vol. 1 & 2''.

Charts

Weekly charts

Year-end charts

Certifications

Personnel
From the Liner Notes on the Original Vinyl Album.

Peter Asher: Cabasa, Cowbell, Trombone and Shaker, Hand Claps, Wood Block, and Percussion.
Ed Black: Guitar, Steel Guitar
Michael Botts: Drums
Mike Bowden: Bass
Richard Bowden: Electric Guitar
John Boylan: Keyboards
Richard Burden: Guitar
John Connor: Harmonica
Dan Dugmore: Steel Guitar
Kenny Edwards: Acoustic Guitar, Bass, Backing Vocal
Chris Ethridge: Bass
Jim Fadden: Harmonica
Don Francisco: Backing Vocals
Andrew Gold: Acoustic Guitar, Backing Vocal, Drums, Electric Guitar, Keyboards, Percussion, Tambourine, Piano, Arp, Congas, Hand Claps
Jim Gordon: Saxophone
Gib Guilbeau: Fiddle
Ginger Holliday: Backing Vocal
Mary Holliday: Backing Vocal
Andy Johnson: Electric Guitar
Mac Johnson: Trumpet
David Kemper: Drums
Clyde King: Backing Vocals
Sneaky Pete Kleinow: Steel Guitar
Danny Kortchmar: Electric Guitar
Russ Kunkel: Drums
Bernie Leadon: Acoustic Guitar
Daryl Leonard: Trumpet
David Lindley: Fiddle
Gail Martin: Trombone
Shirley Matthews: Backing Vocals
Marty McCall: Backing Vocals
Mickey McGee: Drums
Weldon Myrick: Steel Guitar
Spooner Oldham: Piano
Herb Pedersen: Acoustic Guitar, Backing Vocal, Banjo
Norbert Putnam: Bass, Harpsichord
Don Randi: Harpsichord
Lyle Ritz: Concertmaster
Linda Ronstadt: Vocals, Tambourine, Hand Claps, Backing Vocals
John David Souther: Guitar
Buddy Spicher: Fiddle
Dennis St. John: Drums
Nino Tempo: Saxophone
Al Viola: Acoustic Guitar
Waddy: Electric Guitar
Pete Wade: Guitar
Bob Warford: Acoustic Guitar

Producers
Peter Asher: 1, 4, 5, 8,10,11,12
John Boylan: 9
John David Souther: 2,3
Elliot F. Mazer: 6
Nikolas Venet: 7

See also
 List of best-selling albums in the United States

References

1976 greatest hits albums
Linda Ronstadt compilation albums
Asylum Records compilation albums